AT&T Team USA Soundtrack is a sporting compilation by various artists, created for the 2008 Summer Olympics, in Beijing.

Background
On the album appear singers and bands like Lady Antebellum, 3 Doors Down, Nelly, Queen Latifah, Chris Brown, Sheryl Crow, Kate Voegele, and Taylor Swift. The album consist of 15 English tracks and one Spanish track by Luis Fonsi. The album was released on the USA iTunes Store on August 7, 2008, and can be accessed through its official website.

Track listing

References

External links
AT&T.com

Charity albums
2008 compilation albums
2008 Summer Olympics
Sports compilation albums
Olympic albums